Jean-Louis Trudel (born 1967) is a Canadian science fiction writer.  He was born in Toronto, Ontario, Canada and has lived in Toronto, Ottawa, and Montreal before moving to Quebec City, Quebec in 2010.  He teaches history part-time at the University of Ottawa.

While he writes mainly in French, he has authored a few stories in English, published in such venues as Asimov's Science Fiction (January-February 2020), On Spec and Tales of the Shadowmen.  Other stories in English and other languages (Greek, Portuguese, Italian, Russian) have appeared in translation.

Most of his books, for adults and young adults, are science fiction, but a few titles may also be classed as fantasy.  A long-time contributor to Solaris magazine, he is also a science-fiction critic and historian.  

Under the collective name Laurent McAllister, Trudel and Yves Meynard have written three young adult books as part of an ongoing series, as well as several stories.

He has received several literary distinctions, including the "Grand Prix de la Science-Fiction et du Fantastique québécois" in 2001 and several Prix Aurora awards.

Bibliography
 Aller simple pour Saguenal (YA novel, Paulines, Jeunesse-Pop # 91, 1994)
 Pour des soleils froids (novel, Éditions Fleuve Noir, Anticipation # 1942, 1994)
 Un trésor sur Serendib (YA novel, Médiaspaul, Jeunesse-Pop # 94, 1994)
 Le ressuscité de l'Atlantide (novel, Éditions Fleuve Noir, Anticipation # 1955, 1994)
 Les Voleurs de mémoire (YA novel, Médiaspaul, Jeunesse-Pop # 97, 1995)
 Les Rescapés de Serendib (Les Mystères de Serendib --- 1), (YA novel, Médiaspaul, Jeunesse-Pop # 102, 1995)
 Le Prisonnier de Serendib (Les Mystères de Serendib --- 2), (YA novel, Médiaspaul, Jeunesse-Pop # 103, 1995)
 Les Princes de Serendib (Les Mystères de Serendib --- 3), (YA novel, Médiaspaul, Jeunesse-Pop # 110, 1996)
 Des Colons pour Serendib (Les Mystères de Serendib --- 4), (YA novel, Médiaspaul, Jeunesse-Pop # 111, 1996)
 Fièvres sur Serendib (Les Mystères de Serendib --- 5), (YA novel, Médiaspaul, Jeunesse-Pop # 116, 1996)
 Un printemps à Nigelle (YA novel, Médiaspaul, Jeunesse-Pop, # 117, 1997)
 Un été à Nigelle (YA novel, Médiaspaul, Jeunesse-Pop, # 120, 1997)
 Un hiver à Nigelle (YA novel, Médiaspaul, Jeunesse-Pop, # 124, 1997)
 Les bannis de Bételgeuse (YA novel, Médiaspaul, Jeunesse-Pop, # 125, 1998)
 13,5 km sous Montréal (YA novel, Marie-France, La Mangeuse de Lune, 1998)
 Un automne à Nigelle (YA novel, Médiaspaul, Jeunesse-Pop, # 128, 1998)
 Les Contrebandiers de Cañaveral (YA novel, Médiaspaul, Jeunesse-Pop # 132, 1999)
 Nigelle par tous les temps (YA novel, Médiaspaul, coll. Jeunesse-Pop # 135, 2000)
 Demain, les étoiles (YA collection, Pierre Tisseyre, coll. Chacal #, 2000)
 Guerre pour un harmonica (YA novel, Médiaspaul, coll. Jeunesse-Pop # 139, 2000)
 Le messager des orages (YA novel, Médiaspaul, Jeunesse-Pop # 140, 2001) (in collaboration with Yves Meynard, as Laurent McAllister)
 Les transfigurés du Centaure (YA novel, Médiaspaul, Jeunesse-Pop # 143, 2001)
 Le revenant de Fomalhaut (YA novel, Médiaspaul, Jeunesse-Pop # 145, 2002)
 Jonctions impossibles (collection, Vermillon, Parole vivante # 47, 2003)
 Sur le chemin des tornades (YA novel, Médiaspaul, Jeunesse-Pop # 148, 2003) (in collaboration with Yves Meynard, as Laurent McAllister)
 Le perroquet d'Altaïr (YA novel, Médiaspaul, Jeunesse-Pop # 149, 2003) 
 La lune des jardins sans soleil (YA novel, Médiaspaul, Jeunesse-Pop # 150, 2003)
 La princesse de Tianjin (YA novel, Médiaspaul, Jeunesse-Pop # 153, 2004)
 Les insurgés de Tianjin (YA novel, Médiaspaul, Jeunesse-Pop # 154, 2004)
 Le maître des bourrasques (YA novel, Médiaspaul, Jeunesse-Pop # 161, 2006) (in collaboration with Yves Meynard, as Laurent McAllister)

References

External links
 Jean-Louis Trudel's blog  Culture des futurs 
 On-line YA story on the Cybersciences-Junior site L'arche du vide 
 "Gathering the Echoes", short story in webzine HorizonZero
 "L'écho d'une musique abolie", short story in webzine HorizonZero 
 Biographical essay in the Dictionary of Literary Biography from Amazon Jean-Louis Trudel 
 

1967 births
Living people
Canadian science fiction writers
Canadian speculative fiction critics
French science fiction writers
Writers from Quebec City
Writers from Toronto
Science fiction critics
Canadian writers in French
French male novelists
French male non-fiction writers